Marie Denise DeBartolo York (born 1950) is an American billionaire businesswoman, who is the owner and co-chair of the San Francisco 49ers American football team. She is the daughter of late construction magnate Edward J. DeBartolo Sr. and the late Marie Patricia Montani DeBartolo.

Early life
DeBartolo grew up in a family famous for real estate development. She attended Saint Mary's College of Indiana, a Catholic women's college near the University of Notre Dame.

Career
After graduation, she joined the family business, The DeBartolo Corporation, and became its executive vice president. In 1994, following her father's death, she became company co-chairman and all 78 DeBartolo malls were sold.

In 1978, Edward DeBartolo purchased the National Hockey League's Pittsburgh Penguins. and established DeBartolo York as owner and president.  She presided over the Penguins 1990–91 championship season, and was the third woman to serve as president of a Stanley Cup-winning team. In 1991, the year following the championship, she sold the Penguins to assist the DeBartolo Corporation, which was facing challenges in the aftermath of the real estate collapse of 1987.

Denise became operating head of the 49ers in 1999 after her brother, Eddie Jr., was convicted of failing to tell authorities that former Louisiana governor Edwin Edwards attempted to extort him. Although Eddie could have resumed control of the 49ers after a year, he decided instead to turn his controlling stake in the team over to Denise in return for other portions of the family interests. Despite a years-long perception that the league forced the transaction, Eddie revealed in a 2016 interview that he decided to give the 49ers to his sister and brother-in-law in order to focus on his family. She and her husband have since given over control of the 49ers to their son, Jed York.

On May 24, 2018, the York family via 49ers Enterprises bought shares in English association football club Leeds United to become a minority investor, the 49's Enterprises is the business arm of the NFL side San Francisco 49ers.

Personal life
She is married to retired American cancer research pathologist John York. The Yorks have four children: sons Jed and Tony (deceased 2018), and daughters Jenna and Mara; and live in the Youngstown, Ohio suburb of Canfield, Ohio.

References

1950 births
Living people
American billionaires
American people of Italian descent
DeBartolo family
Female billionaires
Pittsburgh Penguins owners
San Francisco 49ers owners
Stanley Cup champions
Saint Mary's College (Indiana) alumni
Businesspeople from Youngstown, Ohio
Women sports owners